Chien Yu-hsiu (born 29 February 1980) is a former badminton player from the Republic of China. Chien graduated from the National Taiwan Sport University and now works as junior coach in Hsinchu. He was the silver medalist at the 1996 World Junior Championships in the boys' doubles event partnered with Huang Shih-chung, and the champion at the 1998 Asian Junior Championships in the boys' singles event. Chien won the senior international tournament at the 2003 U.S. Open. He competed at the 1998 Asian Games, and 2004 Summer Olympics.

His brother Chien Yu-hsun also a professional badminton player.

Achievements

World Junior Championships 
Boys' doubles

Asian Junior Championships 
Boys' singles

IBF World Grand Prix
The World Badminton Grand Prix sanctioned by International Badminton Federation (IBF) since 1983.

Men's singles

IBF International 
Men's singles

Men's doubles

References

External links 
 
 

1980 births
Living people
Sportspeople from New Taipei
Taiwanese male badminton players
Badminton players at the 2004 Summer Olympics
Olympic badminton players of Taiwan
Badminton players at the 1998 Asian Games
Asian Games competitors for Chinese Taipei
21st-century Taiwanese people